Algeciras railway station is the southernmost rail station on the Spanish rail network and on the European mainland, and serves the town of Algeciras, Andalusia.

Information
Algeciras station is located at the end of the Algeciras-Bobadilla railway. It is served by Renfe Media Distancia and Altaria train services to Granada, Córdoba and Madrid. The line is being upgraded by Adif at a cost of €13.5 million.

Services

References

Railway stations in Andalusia
Buildings and structures in Algeciras
Railway stations in Spain opened in 1890